is a passenger railway station in located in the city of Higashiōmi,  Shiga Prefecture, Japan, operated by the private railway operator Ohmi Railway. The station was opened for the Kyocera Shiga Gamo Factory located a short walk away.

Lines
Kyocera-mae Station is served by the Ohmi Railway Main Line, and is located 29.9 rail kilometers from the terminus of the line at Maibara Station.

Station layout
The station consists of one side platform serving a single bi-directional track. There is no station building, but only a shelter on the platform. The station is unattended.

Platforms

Adjacent stations

History
Kyocera-mae Station was opened on March 16, 1991.

Passenger statistics
In fiscal 2019, the station was used by an average of 57 passengers daily (boarding passengers only).

Surroundings
 Kyocera Shiga Gamo Factory

See also
List of railway stations in Japan

References

External links

 Railway official site 

Railway stations in Japan opened in 1991
Railway stations in Shiga Prefecture
Higashiōmi